The Red Hussar is a comedy opera in three acts by Edward Solomon, with a libretto by Henry Pottinger Stephens, concerning a young ballad singer who disguises herself as a Hussar to follow her penniless beloved to France.  By a feat of gallantry, she saves his life and is promoted to the rank of sergeant.  It turns out that she is a rich heiress, and all ends happily.

The piece opened at the Lyric Theatre in London on 23 November 1889, running for 175 performances.  It was the revised version of an opera written several years earlier called The White Sergeant.  It starred Marie Tempest, Hayden Coffin, Arthur Williams and later John Le Hay.

The show also had a New York run, opening on 3 August 1890 at Palmer's Theatre until 11 October, with Tempest making her American debut, and then moving to the Grand Opera House.  The Red Hussar has enjoyed other revivals.

Roles
Ralph Rodney – Ben Davies  
Sir Middlesex Mashem – Albert Christian  
Corporal Bundy – Arthur Williams  
Sir Harry Leighton – C. Hayden Coffin  
Mr. William Byles – Frank M. Wood  
Private Smith – S. King (later replaced by John Le Hay)
Gaylord – A. Ferrand  
Maybud – G. Willoughby  
Kitty Carroll – Marie Tempest  
Barbara Bellasys – Florence Dysart
Daisy – Maud Holland  
Mrs. Magpie – W. Sidney

Musical numbers
Overture 
Act I   –   The Inn Yard of the "Crown," Lyndhurst
No. 1. Chorus with solos, and Song: Bundy – "Merry England" and "Won't you join the army?" 
No. 2. Sir Harry Leighton – "My love and I were singing; my love and I were young" 
No. 3. Ralph Rodney – "When life and I were first acquainted, then life was old and I was young" 
No. 4. Sir Harry Leighton, Ralph Rodney & Barbara – "Pray understand I keep my hand" 
No. 5. Valse Song: Kitty Carroll – "Wand'ring at will o'er dale and hill, gaily my voice is ringing" 
No. 6. Chorus of Soldiers & Villagers – "Tramp, tramp, tramp, tramp, onward we go, boys" 
No. 7. Sir Middlesex Mashem & Chorus – "I am a soldier of renown, a veritable hero" 
No. 8. Concerted Piece: Kitty, Bundy & Soldiers – "Come, sing to us, or forfeit pay" & "When I was but a little child" 
No. 9. Kitty & Rodney – "One winter morn, a maid forlorn sat weeping, weeping by the way" 
No. 10. Finale Act I – "My lad, 'tis time for us to start" 
Entr'acte

Act II   –   The English Camp, near Bruges, France
No. 11. Chorus – "Old Bruges' belfry tells the world that fading is the day" 
No. 12. Sabot Dance and Solo 
No. 13. For Exit of Girls – "Old Bruges' belfry tells the earth that faded is the day" 
No. 14. Sir Harry – "I am lord of a castle, so fair, so grand, that I built of mine own free will" 
No. 15. Mrs. Magpie & Bundy – "There was a pretty maiden, and she lov'd a sailor bold" 
No. 16. Barbara – "My love must be a soldier with a great large heart" 
No. 17. Drummer Boys' Chorus – "You may tell by our manners airy, we belong to the military!" 
No. 18. Recit. & Song of the Regiment: Kitty and Chorus – "Thanks, comrades, thanks for this your greeting" 
No. 19. Rodney – "How calm and still the night!  How soft and dim the light!" 
No. 20. Kitty & Rodney – "My Kitty, dear, how came you here?  So far away from home" 
No. 21. Finale Act II – "Hasn't she a soft white hand!" 
Entr'acte

Act III   –   The Garden and Terrace of Avon Manor
No. 22. Chorus – "A Jubilee! A Jubilee! A Jubilee today!" 
No. 23. Chorus of Children (Bridesmaids & Drummer Boys) – "Happy little maidens all are we" 
No. 24. Country Dance 
No. 25. Kitty – "I dreamt I was a child again, and stood by a silver sea" 
No. 26. Bundy – "I intend to sing a song with variations" 
No. 27. Kitty, Barbara, Mrs. Magpie, Rodney, Leighton & Sir Middlesex – "One little kiss" 
No. 28. Finale Act III – "Steady, boys, steady; ready, boys, ready"

Notes

External links
Vocal score
Midi files and cast list
Photographs in costume
Lists shows opening in London in 1889

English-language operas
English comic operas
Operas by Edward Solomon
Operas
1889 operas